UNESCO's Design Cities project is part of the wider Creative Cities Network. The Network launched in 2004, and has member cities in seven creative fields. The other fields are: Crafts and Folk Art, Music, Film, Gastronomy, Literature, and Media Arts.

Criteria for UNESCO Design Cities 
To be approved as a Design City, cities need to meet a number of criteria set by UNESCO.

Designated UNESCO Design Cities share similar characteristics such as having an established design industry; cultural landscape maintained by design and the built environment (architecture, urban planning, public spaces, monuments, transportation); design schools and design research centers; practicing groups of designers with a continuous activity at a local and national level; experience in hosting fairs, events and exhibits dedicated to design; opportunity for local designers and urban planners to take advantage of local materials and urban/natural conditions; design-driven creative industries such as architecture and interiors, fashion and textiles, jewelry and accessories, interaction design, urban design, sustainable design.

There are 40 Cities of Design:

See also 

 City of Crafts and Folk Arts
 City of Film
City of Gastronomy
City of Literature
City of Music

References 

UNESCO
Design
Lists of cities